Nariman Aliev (Ukrainian: Наріма́н Рідьва́нович Алі́єв) (born 15 December 1992) — Ukrainian director and screenwriter of Crimean Tatar origin. Winner of The National Film Critics Award "Kinokolo" 2019 (Best Director and Best Film).

Honored Artist of Ukraine (2020).

Biography 
Nariman Aliev was born on December 15, 1992 in the village of Petrivka, Krasnohvardiiske Raion, Autonomous Republic of Crimea.

In 2009 he graduated from Petrivska Secondary School of I-III grades № 1.

In 2013, he received a bachelor's degree in television and film directing from the Institute of Screen Arts (Oleh Fialko's workshop).

In 2014 he received a diploma of a specialist in television directing from Kyiv National I. K. Karpenko-Kary Theatre, Cinema and Television University.

In 2016, he was nominated for the Crystal Bear of the Berlin International Film Festival for his short film "Without You".

Member of the Ukrainian Film Academy since 2017. 

Member of the European Film Academy since 2019.

Member of the Public Council of the Ukrainian Oscar Committee since 2019.

Nariman Aliev's debut feature film Homeward (2019) was screened in the Un Certain Regard section at the 72nd Cannes International Film Festival.

Filmography 

 2013 — Back at Dawn (Crimean Tatar: Tan Atqanda Qaytmaq) — director, screenwriter, cameraman, editing, producer
 2013 — Dima — operator, editing
 2014 — I Love You (Crimean Tatar: Seni Sevem) — director, screenwriter, cameraman, editing, producer
 2014 — Black (Azerbaijani: Qara) — installation
 2014 — Son — operator
 2016 — Without You (Crimean Tatar: Sensiz) — director, screenwriter, cameraman, editing, producer
 2019 - Homeward (Crimean Tatar: Evge)— director, screenwriter

Interesting facts 

 In his short films he worked only with non-professional actors, most of them being his relatives.
 His parents, Ridvan Aliev and Gulzhiyan Aliev, are also the producers of all his short films.
 Nariman Aliev's three short films "Return at Dawn", "I Love You" and "Without You" form the "Crimean Stories" trilogy. 
 The short film "Without You" is dedicated to the director's brother Erfan Selimov, who died in a car accident in 2010.

References

External links 

 

1992 births
Living people
Ukrainian screenwriters
Ukrainian film directors